George Royal (1961–1981) was a Canadian Hall of Fame Thoroughbred racehorse.

Background
George Royal was a bay horse foaled in Cloverdale, British Columbia. He was sired by Dark Hawk out of the mare Polly Bashaw. His great-grandsire was Hyperion, son of the English Triple Crown Champion Gainsborough. He was originally owned by Robert Hall and Ernie Hammond and trained by Robert W. Hall.

Racing career
The colt began racing at two at Vancouver's Exhibition Park, winning four of his eight starts. Although a winner of nine consecutive stakes races at age three, he received little notice in Canada in 1964 as a result of Northern Dancer becoming the first Canadian-bred to win the Kentucky Derby. Ridden and eventually trained by Texan Donald Richardson, George Royal was sent to California to compete, where Johnny Longden took over as jockey. In 1965, George Dunn handled his conditioning, for a short time, on behalf of Robert Hall. In 1965, George Royal won the 1-mile San Juan Capistrano Handicap on the turf at Santa Anita Park, then later the Canadian International Stakes at Woodbine Racetrack in Toronto. His performances in 1965 made him the first British Columbia-bred horse to win Canadian Horse of the Year honours.  In 1965 George Royal made Canadian history when he became the 1st horse to ride in a commercial passenger plane when he flew with Air Canada from Vancouver to Toronto. In 1966, in Johnny Longden's last race as a jockey, George Royal repeated as winner of the San Juan Capistrano Handicap.  In the Clubhouse at Santa Anita Park there is an oil painting of the finish of the 1966 San Juan Capistrano, which was also used for the cover of the Santa Anita official program during the 1967 racing season. That fall, jockey Ismael Valenzuela made it back-to-back wins in the Canadian International Stakes.

Stud record
Retired to stud duty as number two in earnings by a Canadian-bred horse, George Royal stood at Robert W. Hall's Emerald Acres farm in Aldergrove, British Columbia, where he sired several stakes winners before suffering a stroke in 1981 that led to his having to be humanely euthanized.  He was buried at the family farm, Emerald Acres, where a monument marks the spot.

Honours
On its creation in 1976, George Royal was inducted in the Canadian Horse Racing Hall of Fame. Honored by the British Columbia Horse Racing Hall of Fame, his statue stands in the paddock at Hastings Racecourse in Vancouver and a stakes race there bears his name.

References
 George Royal at the Canadian Horse Racing Hall of Fame
 George Royal's pedigree and partial racing stats

1961 racehorse births
1981 racehorse deaths
Racehorses bred in Canada
Racehorses trained in Canada
Canadian Thoroughbred Horse of the Year
Canadian Horse Racing Hall of Fame inductees
Thoroughbred family 4-d